The Constitution Alteration (Post-War Reconstruction and Democratic Rights) Bill 1944 was an unsuccessful proposal to alter the Australian Constitution to give the Commonwealth an additional 14 powers for a period of five years, with Prime Minister John Curtin saying that maintaining wartime controls was necessary for Australia to re-adjust to peacetime conditions. It was put to voters for approval in an Australian referendum held on 19 August 1944.

Question

Do you approve of the proposed law for the alteration of the Constitution entitled 'Constitution Alteration (Post-War Reconstruction and Democratic Rights) 1944'?

Proposed amendment
The referendum was known as the "14 powers", or the "14 points referendum". It sought to give the federal government power, over a period of five years, to legislate on a wide variety of matters.

The 14 powers
The powers the government sought to gain included:

 The rehabilitation of former servicemen
 National health
 Family allowances
 Employment and unemployment
 The ability to legislate for Indigenous Australians
 Corporations, or combines
 Foreign investment
 Trust laws
 Monopolies
 Air transport, 
 Uniformity of railway gauges
 Marketing of commodities
 Manufacturing (production) and sales of goods
 National infrastructure (subject to state approval)

Many of these powers also included limitations as safeguards against the abuse of legislative power.

Restrictions on government power
 Freedom of speech

Freedom of speech and freedom of expression were restrictions on state and government power that the commonwealth sought to legislate on.

 Freedom of religion
The government also sought to apply the right to freedom of religion to state governments.

Referendum
All of these points (the proposed heads of power and restrictions on power) were put to referendum in the form of a single question. It is notable that the points referring to aviation, employment, marketing, trusts, corporations, combines and monopolies had previously been the subject of referendums advanced by both Labor and conservative parties that had not been carried.

The 14 proposals covered the participation of the federal government in postwar reconstruction, including control over employment, profiteering and prices, and related subjects.

For and against
The proposal was put forward and supported by the Australian Labor Party government. It was opposed by the federal opposition (United Australia Party and the Country Party).

For

Prime Minister John Curtin gave his broadcast to the nation on 25 July 1944. The Prime Minister said to abandon wartime controls on the declaration of peace would cause disorganization to the social system and destroy the capacity of the system to meet the need of the first few disturbed years after the war.

Against

The Country Party leader, Arthur Fadden, gave his broadcast against the motion, stating :
Its proposal means that in peacetime, you will work under government compulsion, you will eat and wear what the bureaucrats ration out to you: you will live in mass-produced government dwellings: and your children will work wherever the bureaucrats tell them to work! If granted nothing can be made, produced, built or grown without permission. Everything that is grown or made, carried or carted, sold or exchanged will be under government control. A yes vote would enable the Government to implement Labour's policy of socialization. Nationalization of Industry would follow.

Results
Do you approve of the proposed law for the alteration of the Constitution entitled 'Constitution Alteration (Post-War Reconstruction and Democratic Rights) 1944'?

See also
Curtin Government

References

1944 referendums
1944
Referendum
August 1944 events